The legislative districts of Ilocos Sur are the representations of the province of Ilocos Sur in the various national legislatures of the Philippines. The province is currently represented in the lower house of the Congress of the Philippines through its first and second congressional districts.

Abra last formed part of the province's representation in 1919.

The first district of Ilocos Sur is among the original representative districts from 1907 which has never changed in territorial coverage, along with Albay's first, Ilocos Norte's first and second, and Iloilo's first districts.

History 
Ilocos Sur, which at the time included the sub-province of Abra, was initially divided in 1907 into three representative districts. Abra was last represented as part of the province's now-defunct third district in 1919, after its re-establishment as a regular province on March 10, 1917, by virtue of Act No. 2683 warranted its separate representation, thereby reducing Ilocos Sur to two districts.

When the Philippine Commission detached Tagudin from Ilocos Sur and made it the capital of the sub-province of Amburayan in Mountain Province on May 15, 1907, by virtue of Act No. 1646, the town's residents were still allowed to vote as part of the Ilocos Sur's second district. This arrangement was terminated on August 10, 1916, under Act No. 2657 (the Administrative Code of the Philippine Islands), which removed the town from the second district.

The enactment of Act No. 2877 in 1920 reorganized northwestern Luzon, by abolishing the sub-province of Amburayan in the undivided Mountain Province and annexing several of its municipal entities—Alilem, Sigay, Sugpon, Suyo and its capital Tagudin—to Ilocos Sur. The Lepanto sub-province townships of Angaki, Concepcion, San Emilio and its capital Cervantes were also placed under the jurisdiction of Ilocos Sur. However residents of these areas remained represented by the Mountain Province's appointed assembly members until they were finally extended the right to vote in assembly district elections in 1935, after the passage of Act No. 4203 placed them in the second district of Ilocos Sur.

Ilocos Sur was represented in the Interim Batasang Pambansa as part of Region I from 1978 to 1984, and elected two representatives to the Regular Batasang Pambansa in 1984. The province retained its two congressional districts under the new Constitution which was proclaimed on February 11, 1987, and elected members to the restored House of Representatives starting that same year.

1st District 

City: Vigan (became city 2001)
Municipalities: Cabugao, Magsingal, San Juan (Lapog), Santa Catalina, Santo Domingo, Sinait, Bantay (re-established 1911), Caoayan (re-established 1911), San Vicente (re-established 1911), San Ildefonso (re-established 1919)
Population (2020):  298,333

Notes

2nd District 

City: Candon (became city 2001)
Municipalities: Banayoyo, Burgos, Galimuyod, Lidlidda, Nagbukel, Narvacan, Salcedo (Baugen), San Esteban, Santa, Santa Cruz, Santa Lucia, Santa Maria, Santiago, Alilem, Cervantes, Gregorio del Pilar (Concepcion), Quirino (Angaki), San Emilio, Sigay, Sugpon, Suyo, Tagudin
Population (2020):  407,676

Notes

1907–1916 
Municipalities: Candon, Narvacan, Santa Cruz, Santa Lucia, Santa Maria, Santiago, Tagudin, San Esteban (re-established 1911)

Notes

1916–1919 
Municipalities: Candon, Narvacan, San Esteban, Santa Cruz, Santa Lucia, Santa Maria, Santiago

1919–1935 
Municipalities: Candon, Narvacan, San Esteban, Santa, Santa Cruz, Santa Lucia, Santa Maria, Santiago, Banayoyo (established 1919), Lidlidda (established 1919), Nagbuquel (established 1919), Burgos (Nueva Coveta) (established 1920), Bauguen (established 1922), Galimuyod (established 1922)

3rd District (defunct) 
 
Municipalities: Bangued, Bucay, Dolores, La Paz, Pidigan, Pilar, San Quintin, Santa, Tayum

At-Large (defunct)

1943–1944

1984–1986

See also 
Legislative district of Abra
Legislative district of Mountain Province

References 

Ilocos Sur
Politics of Ilocos Sur